Ugia serrilinea is a species of moth in the family Erebidae. It is found on Borneo, Peninsular Malaysia and in Thailand and Indonesia (Sumatra, Sulawesi). The habitat consists of lowland forests, including heath forests.

References

Moths described in 1926
Ugia
Moths of Asia